Kristina Walker (born May 9, 1996) is a Canadian rower. Walker's hometown is Wolfe Island, Ontario.

Career
In June 2021, Walker was named to Canada's 2020 Olympic team in the women's four boat.

References

1996 births
Canadian female rowers
Living people
People from Coquitlam
Rowers at the 2020 Summer Olympics
21st-century Canadian women